The Ghadar Movement was an early 20th century, international political movement founded by expatriate Indians to overthrow British rule in India. The early movement was created by revolutionaries who lived and worked on the West Coast of the United States and Canada, but the movement later spread to India and Indian diasporic communities around the world. The official founding has been dated to a meeting on 15 July 1913 in Astoria, Oregon, with the Ghadar headquarters and Hindustan Ghadar newspaper based in San Francisco, California.

Following the outbreak of World War I in 1914, some Ghadar party members returned to Punjab to incite armed revolution for Indian Independence.  Ghadarites smuggled arms into India and incited Indian troops to mutiny against the British. This uprising, known as the Ghadar Mutiny, was unsuccessful, and 42 mutineers were executed following the Lahore Conspiracy Case trial. From 1914 to 1917 Ghadarites continued underground anti-colonial actions with the support of Germany and Ottoman Turkey, known as the Hindu–German Conspiracy, which led to a sensational trial in San Francisco in 1917.

Following the war's conclusion, the party in the United States fractured into a Communist and an Indian Socialist faction. The party was formally dissolved in 1948. Key participants in the Ghadar Movement included Bhai Parmanand, Vishnu Ganesh Pingle, Sohan Singh Bhakna, Bhagwan Singh Gyanee, Har Dayal, Tarak Nath Das, Bhagat Singh Thind, Kartar Singh Sarabha, Abdul Hafiz Mohamed Barakatullah, Rashbehari Bose, and Gulab Kaur. Although its attempts at overthrowing the British Raj were unsuccessful, the insurrectionary ideals of the Ghadar Party influenced members of the Indian Independence Movement opposed to Gandhian nonviolence. To carry out other revolutionary activities, "Swadesh Sevak Home" at Vancouver and United India House at Seattle was set-up.

Etymology 
Ghadar is a Punjabi and Urdu word derived from Arabic which means "revolt" or "rebellion." It is often also spelled Ghadr or Gadar in English. The movement's name was closely associated with its newspaper, the Hindustan Ghadar.

Background

Between 1903 and 1913 approximately 10,000 South Asians emigres entered North America, mostly from the rural regions of central Punjab. About half the Punjabis had served in the British military. The Canadian government decided to curtail this influx with a series of laws, which were aimed at limiting the entry of South Asians into the country and restricting the political rights of those already in the country. Many migrants came to work in the fields, factories, and logging camps of Northern California and the Pacific Northwest, where they were exposed to labor unions and the ideas of the radical Industrial Workers of the World or IWW. The migrants of the Pacific Northwest banded together in Sikh gurdwaras and formed political Hindustani Associations for mutual aid.

Nationalist sentiments were also building around the world among South Asian emigres and students, where they could organize more freely than in British India. Several dozen students came to study at the University of Berkeley, some spurred by a scholarship offered by a wealthy Punjabi farmer. Revolutionary intellectuals like Har Dayal and Taraknath Das attempted to organize students and educate them in anarchist and nationalist ideas. 

RasBihari Bose on request from Vishnu Ganesh Pingle, an American trained Ghadar, who met Bose at Benares and requested him to take up the leadership of the coming revolution. But before accepting the responsibility, he sent Sachin Sanyal to the Punjab to assess the situation. Sachin returned very optimistic, in the United States and Canada with the aim to liberate India from British rule. The movement began with a group of immigrants known as the Hindustani Workers of the Pacific Coast.

The Ghadar Party, initially the Pacific Coast Hindustan Association, was formed on 15 July 1913 in the United States but before a decision to create headquarter at Yugantar Ashram in San Francisco was taken at a meeting in the town of Astoria in the state of Oregon in USA under the leadership of Har Dayal, Sant Baba Wasakha Singh Dadehar, Baba Jawala Singh, Santokh Singh and Sohan Singh Bhakna as its president. The members of the party were Indian immigrants, largely from Punjab. Many of its members were students at University of California at Berkeley including Dayal, Tarak Nath Das, Maulavi Barkatullah, Harnam Singh Tundilat, Kartar Singh Sarabha and V.G. Pingle. The party quickly gained support from Indian expatriates, especially in the United States, Canada, East Africa, and Asia.

Newspaper 

The party was built around the weekly paper The Ghadar, which carried the caption on the masthead: Angrezi Raj Ka Dushman (an enemy of the British rule). "Wanted brave soldiers", the Ghadar declared, "to stir up rebellion in India. Pay-death; Price-martyrdom; Pension-liberty; Field of battle-India". The ideology of the party was strongly secular. In the words of Sohan Singh Bhakna, who later became a major peasant leader of Punjab: "We were not Sikhs or Punjabis. Our religion was patriotism". The first issue of The Ghadar, was published in San Francisco on 1 November 1913.

As Kartar Singh Sarabha, one of the founders of the party, wrote in the first issue: "Today there begins 'Ghadar' in foreign lands, but in our country's tongue, a war against the British Raj. What is our name? Ghadar. What is our work? Ghadar. Where will be the Revolution? In India. The time will soon come when rifles and blood will take the place of pens and ink."

Following the voyage of the Komagata Maru in 1914, a direct challenge to Canadian anti-Indian immigration laws, several thousand Indians resident in the United States sold their business and homes ready to drive the British from India. Sohan Singh Bhakna was already in British hands, and the leadership fell to Ram Chandra. Following the entry of Canada into World War I, the organisation was centred in the USA and received substantial funding from the German government. They had a very militant tone, as illustrated by this quote from Harnam Singh:

No pundits or mullahs do we need
The party rose to prominence in the second decade of the 20th century, and grew in strength owing to Indian discontent over World War I and the lack of political reforms.

In 1917 some of their leaders were arrested and put on trial in the Hindu German Conspiracy Trial in which their paper was quoted.

In 1914, Kasi Ram Joshi a member of the party from Haryana, returned to India from America. On 15 March 1915 he was hanged by the colonial government.

The Ghadar party commanded a loyal following the province of Punjab, but many of its most prominent activists were forced into exile to Canada and the United States. It ceased to play an active role in Indian politics after.

Although publication such as independence Hindustan and revolution activities of Ghadar Party against British rule continued from 5 wood street San Francisco, place where Ghadar Memorial has been built but Har Dayal one among its founding members severed all connections with revolutionists by its open letter published in March 1919 in Indian newspapers and new Statesman USA, and by writing to British Goveronment for obtaining Amnesty for himself.

The party had active members in other countries such as Mexico, Japan, China, Singapore, Thailand, Philippines, Malaya, Indo-China and Eastern and Southern Africa.

Founding members 
 Sohan Singh Bhakna (President)
 Kesar Singh (Vice-President)
 Baba Jawala Singh (Vice-President)
 Kartar Singh Sarabha (Editor, Punjabi Gadar)
 Pt. Kanshi Ram (Treasurer)
 Munshi Ram (Organizing Secretary)
 Lala Thaker Das (Dhuri) (Vice Secretary)
 Lala Hardayal
 Udham Singh
 Bhai Parmanand
 Tarak Nath Das
 V. G. Pingle
 Bhagwan Singh Gyanee
 Santokh Singh (Ghadarite)
 Balwant Singh (Ghadarite)
 Rehmat Ali (Ghadarite)
 Harnam Singh Tundilat
 G. D. Verma
 Nidhan Singh Chugha
Baba Chattar Singh Ahluwalia (Jethuwal) 
 Baba Harnam Singh (Kari Sari)
 Mangu Ram Mugowalia
 Karim Bakhsh
 Amir Chand
 Sant Baba Wasakha Singh
 Maulavi Barkatullah
 Harnam Singh Saini
 Pandurang Sadashiv Khankhoje
 Ganda Singh Phangureh
 Karim Bux
 Baba Prithvi Singh Azad
 Gulab Kaur
 Pt. Ram Rakha
 Sohanlal Pathak

See also 
 Ghadar Mutiny
 Communist Ghadar Party of India
 Hindu–German Conspiracy

References 
Notes

Sources
.

Further reading

Singh, G. (2019). Jodh Singh, the Ghadar Movement and the Anti-Colonial Deviant in the Anglo-American Imagination*. Past & Present.
 Ajmer Singh - Gadari Babe Kaun San -https://archive.org/details/GadriBabeKounSanByAjmerSingh

External links

A Gallery on Gadar Party
Ghadar Party materials in the South Asian American Digital Archive (SAADA)
Ghadar: The Indian Immigrant Outrage Against Canadian Injustices 1900 - 1918 by Sukhdeep Bhoi
The Hindustan Ghadar Collection. The Bancroft Library, University of California, Berkeley
 Communist Ghadar Party of India

Hindu–German Conspiracy
 
Indian-American history
Revolutionary movement for Indian independence
South Asian American organizations
Sikhism in the United States
Political parties established in 1913
Political parties disestablished in 1919
1913 establishments in the United States
Defunct political parties in the United States
Indian nationalist political parties